The use of profanity in films has often been controversial, but has increased significantly in recent years. The use of the word fuck in film draws particular criticism; in 2005, the documentary Fuck dealt entirely with this phenomenon. The word fuck is thought to be the vulgar term used most in American film.

The 1927 Motion Picture Production Code, better known as the "Hays Code", banned the use of profanity outright. It was not until 1968 that the Motion Picture Association of America established a system of ratings to use as a guide to determine the appropriateness of the film's content. In 1970, M*A*S*H became the first American major motion picture to use the word fuck.

The MPAA rating system typically assigns a PG-13 rating if a film contains the word used once not in the context of sex. The R rating is normally required if the film contains more than one utterance or if the word is used in a sexual context; however, there are exceptions to this rule. In some cases, filmmakers appealed the rating because their target audience might avoid an R-rated film. Censors have been more lenient about the word in films that portray historical events. The ratings system is voluntary; there is no legal requirement that filmmakers submit their movies to be rated.

This is a list of non-pornographic, English-language feature films containing at least 150 spoken uses of the word fuck (or one of its derivatives), ordered by the number of such uses.

List

Notes

References

Sources
 Family Media Guide — source for profanity counts, now defunct. The reviews are still available in the Internet Archive.
 Preview Online — source for profanity counts, now defunct. The reviews are still available in the Internet Archive.
 Filmy Age Rating — source for profanity counts
 Screen It! Entertainment Reviews — source for profanity counts
 Guide For Parents — source for profanity counts
 Kids in mind — source for profanity counts
 Filmy Rating Reviews — source for profanity counts
 Movie F Words — source for profanity counts

 Filmy Rating — source for profanity counts

External links
A Brief History of The F-Bomb in 10 Movies
A Collection of Counted F-Words from Movies & Shows

Fuck
Fuck
English profanity
Sexual slang
Sexuality-related lists